Hartell may refer to:

Hartell, Alberta, an unincorporated community in Alberta, Canada

People with the surname
John A. Hartell (1902–1995), American artist
Lee R. Hartell (1923–1951), United States Army officer and Medal of Honor recipient